The following is a list of county-maintained highways in Kandiyohi County, Minnesota, United States. Some of the routes in this list are also County State-Aid Highways (CSAH.)

Route list

References

Kandiyohi